Aijaz is a given name of Pakistani origins. Notable people with the name include:

 Aijaz Ahmad (1941–2022), Indian Marxist literary theorist and political commentator
 Aijaz Ahmad Mir (born 1986), Indian politician
 Aijaz Ali (born 1968), Pakistani born American cricketer
 Aijaz Ali Shah Sheerazi, Pakistani politician
 Aijaz Aslam (born 1972), Pakistani actor
 Aijaz Dhebar (born 1976), Indian politician
 Aijaz Haroon (fl. 2011), Pakistani airline captain and managing director
 Aijaz Hussain Jakhrani (born 1967), Pakistani politician, member of the National Assembly of Pakistan
 Aijaz Siddiqi (1911–1978), Urdu writer and poet

Pakistani masculine given names